Kapurpurawan Rock Formation is a natural rock formation in Burgos, Ilocos Norte, Philippines.

It is located on the northwestern tip of Burgos and is situated right next to another popular tourist attraction, Bangui Wind Farm. 

It was named after the Ilocano word "puraw" which means "white”, in reference to the white limestone formations formed over time.

References 

Rock formations